The Ford Fiesta WRC is a World Rally Car built by the M-Sport World Rally Team for use in the World Rally Championship starting in 2017. It is based upon the 2017 Ford Fiesta road car, and replaced the Ford Fiesta RS WRC, which competed between 2011 and 2016. It was built to the fourth generation of World Rally Car regulations that were introduced in 2017.

The Fiesta WRC was successful from its début, winning the 2017 Monte Carlo Rally, first round it entered. The car took five wins in its first season, with two for Sébastien Ogier and Julien Ingrassia, two for Ott Tänak and Martin Järveoja, and one for Elfyn Evans and Daniel Barritt. Ogier and Ingrassia went on to win the World Championships for Drivers and Co-Drivers, their fifth titles. M-Sport won the World Championship for Manufacturers, their first title since 2007.

World Rally Championship results

Championship titles

Rally victories

WRC results

* Season still in progress.

See also
 World Rally Car
 Citroën DS3 WRC
 Citroën C3 WRC
 Ford Fiesta RS WRC
 Hyundai i20 WRC
 Hyundai i20 Coupe WRC
 Mini John Cooper Works WRC
 Toyota Yaris WRC
 Volkswagen Polo R WRC
 Ford Fiesta R5

Notes

References

External links
Technical details at wrc.com 
Fiesta WRC 2017 – juwra.com

World Rally Cars
WRC
All-wheel-drive vehicles
Ford Rally Sport vehicles
World Rally championship-winning cars